Inferior transverse ligament can refer to:
 Inferior transverse ligament of scapula
 Inferior transverse ligament of the tibiofibular syndesmosis